The 1935 season was the Chicago Bears' 16th in the National Football League and 13th season under head coach  George Halas. The team was unable to match on their 13–0 record from 1934 and finished with a 6–4–2 record and finishing in a tie for third (and last) place in the Western Division, and failed to return to the championship game. The Bears had little trouble with the weaker teams in the league, led the league in scoring, and occasionally showed signs of brilliance against top-flight competition, but for the most part, they were outclassed by the Lions, Packers, and Giants. The biggest problem was the veterans from the 1920s had largely retired or were past their prime but not enough young talent had emerged to offset these losses. In particular, the retirement of Link Lyman and Red Grange hurt the team, especially on defense. Additionally, Bronko Nagurski and Bill Hewitt were injured for large portions of the season and could not play to their normal level.

Season highlights
Keith Molesworth was the brightest spot on offense and was a triple threat from the halfback position. Bernie Masterson ran the T-formation adequately but was not particularly accurate as a passer. Luke Johnsos was the most reliable end and led the team in receptions. Gene Ronzani led the club in rushing, but Feathers, Molesworth, and Manders shared rushing duties. Manders had a subpar year as a kicker, making only 1 of 8 field goals. The Bears lost to Green Bay twice, to Detroit once (tying the Lions in the other game), split the series with New  York, and beat the Redskins in their only meeting. After a 5–2 start, the Bears faded in the end, winning only 1 of their last 5 games, with one tie. Of note, every other team in the NFL ran either the Single Wing or the A Formation (a variant of the Single Wing run only by the Giants), but the Bears still used the T formation. Many today falsely believe the Bears of the 1940s "invented" the modern T and then everyone adopted it. The truth is everyone ran the T when the league began in 1920. All the other teams switched to the Single Wing after it was perfected in the college game. Meanwhile, coach George Halas and his assistants perfected the T, which they never changed from, and other teams switched back from the Single Wing only after the Bears of the 1940s demonstrated the T's superiority.

Future Hall of Fame players
Bill Hewitt, end
George Musso, tackle
Bronko Nagurski, fullback

Other leading players
Beattie Feathers, halfback
Luke Johnsos, end
Bill Karr, end
Joe Kopcha, guard
Jack Manders, fullback/kicker
Bernie Masterson, quarterback
Keith Molesworth, halfback
Gene Ronzani, back

Players departed from 1934
Carl Brumbaugh, quarterback (did not play for unknown reasons)
Red Grange, back (retired)
Walt Kiesling, guard (signed by Packers)
Link Lyman, tackle (retired)

Schedule

Standings

References

Chicago Bears
Chicago Bears seasons
Chicago Bears